Michael Benaroya (born February 23, 1981) is an American film producer. He is chief executive officer at Benaroya Pictures.

Biography
Benaroya was born to a Jewish family on February 23, 1981, in Seattle, Washington, U.S. His grandfather was Jack Benaroya (1921–2012), a real estate developer and philanthropist. Benaroya graduated from Pomona College, where he received a B.A. in economics.

Career 
He moved to Los Angeles, California, in 2006 to pursue a career in the film industry and founded Benaroya Pictures, a film finance and production company, where he serves as its CEO.

Filmography

As a producer
New York, I Love You (2009)
The Romantics (2010)
Margin Call (2011)
Catch .44 (2011)
The Words (2012)
Lawless (2012)
Kill Your Darlings (2013)
Hateship, Loveship (2013)
Felony (2013)
Parts per Billion (2014)
Cymbeline (2015)
Queen of the Desert (2015)
Idol's Eye (2015)
Elvis & Nixon (2016)
Cell (2016)
Wake (2016) (cancelled)
Salt and Fire (2016)
 Haunting on Fraternity Row (2018)
 Against the Clock (2018)

References

External links 
 

Living people
1981 births
Businesspeople from Seattle
People from Los Angeles
Pomona College alumni
Film producers from California
20th-century American Jews
American people of Lebanese-Jewish descent
Film producers from Washington (state)
Jewish film people
21st-century American Jews